Mohammad Reza Khanmohammadi Khorrami (born 1964) is an Iranian academic and politician.

Khanmohammadi Khorrami was born in Khorramdarreh, Zanjan Province. He is a member of the present Islamic Consultative Assembly from the electorate of Khorramdarreh and Abhar. Khanmohammadi Khorrami won with 52,339 (44.36%) votes.

References

People from Zanjan Province
Deputies of Abhar and Khorramdarreh
Iranian chemists
Living people
1964 births
Members of the 9th Islamic Consultative Assembly
Shahid Beheshti University alumni
Academic staff of Imam Khomeini International University